Kozloduy Cove is a 1.4 km wide cove indenting for 1.25 km the east coast of Robert Island, South Shetland Islands between Kitchen Point and Perelik Point.  Bulgarian early mapping in 2009.  Named after the town of Kozloduy in northwestern Bulgaria.

Map
 L.L. Ivanov. Antarctica: Livingston Island and Greenwich, Robert, Snow and Smith Islands. Scale 1:120000 topographic map.  Troyan: Manfred Wörner Foundation, 2009.

References
 Kozloduy Cove. SCAR Composite Gazetteer of Antarctica
 Bulgarian Antarctic Gazetteer. Antarctic Place-names Commission. (details in Bulgarian, basic data in English)

External links
 Kozloduy Cove. Copernix satellite image

Coves of Robert Island
Bulgaria and the Antarctic